Andreas Knebel (born 21 June 1960) is a former East German athlete who competed mainly in the 400 metres.

He competed for East Germany in the 1980 Summer Olympics held in Moscow in the 4 × 400 metres relay where he won the silver medal with his teammates Klaus Thiele, Frank Schaffer and Volker Beck.

References

1960 births
Living people
People from Sangerhausen
People from Bezirk Halle
East German male sprinters
Sportspeople from Saxony-Anhalt
Olympic athletes of East Germany
Athletes (track and field) at the 1980 Summer Olympics
Olympic silver medalists for East Germany
European Athletics Championships medalists
Medalists at the 1980 Summer Olympics
Olympic silver medalists in athletics (track and field)
Recipients of the Patriotic Order of Merit in bronze